Connirae Andreas is an American author and psychotherapist who is known for her work within the field of Neuro-linguistic programming (NLP).

Education 
Connirae Andreas studied undergraduate psychology at the University of Kansas in 1975. She obtained an MA in clinical psychology from the University of Colorado in 1979 and a PhD in psychotherapy from North Central University in 1989.

Career 
She is the originator of the Core Transformation process which uses symptoms to bring a person into the interpersonal realm. Andreas taught and developed that process with her sister and co-author, Tamara Andreas. Their book Core Transformation has been published in 12 languages, and is an approach that has been described as "elegant",  "fascinating", "profound", "pioneering", and "interesting". Connirae and her sister further discussed the process in subsequent publications.

Connirae Andreas worked with her husband, Steve Andreas, in multiple areas of NLP. They have published several books on NLP through the Real People Press publishing business established by Steve Andreas. Their first book on NLP, Frogs Into Princes sold over 500,000 copies. The couple has also edited several books of the work of the founders of NLP Richard Bandler and John Grinder, including Trance-Formations and Using Your Brain for a Change. In 1979 they established NLP Comprehensive, based in Colorado, to organize NLP trainings. In the 2013 book, Lisa Wake, Richard Gray, and Frank Bourke describe Connirae and her husband Steve as "two of the founding lights in NLP and its most well-known interpreters"

Andreas is also known for her work developing Eye Movement Integration Therapy, and has been an invited speaker at multiple Milton H. Erickson Foundation meetings. She is also an honorary fellow of the Association for Neuro Linguistic Programming.

Selected bibliography

Translated into German in 1995, English version reprinted in 2015 
Psychology Today reviewed this in 2014
Andreas, Connirae & Steve Andreas, Change your mind—and keep the change, advanced NLP submodalities interventions, Boulder, CO : Real People Press, 1987, 
 Andreas, Connirae & Steve Andreas, Heart of the mind: engaging your inner power to change with neuro-linguistic programming, Boulder, CO : Real People Press, 1989, 
Fourth most popular non-fiction book in Lithuania in 2020
Also in French

Translated into German in 2020.

Edited books

Book chapters

 Andreas, Connirae & Andreas, Tamara. (1998). "Core Transformation: A Brief Therapy Approach to Emotional and Spiritual Healing" in  Michael F. Hoyt (ed.) Constructive Therapies. Guilford Press.

References

External links

Living people
Year of birth missing (living people)
American psychotherapists
Neuro-linguistic programming writers